is a type of Japanese pottery traditionally from Arao, Kumamoto.

External links 

 http://www.mingei-okumura.com/fs/mingei/c/syoudai

Culture in Kumamoto Prefecture
Japanese pottery